Mahone is a surname.

Mahone or Mahones in plural may refer to:

Mahone

Places
Mahone Bay, bay on the Atlantic coast of Nova Scotia, Canada
Mahone Bay, Nova Scotia, town located on the northwest shore of Mahone Bay
Mahone, West Virginia, unincorporated community in Ritchie County, West Virginia, United States

People
Austin Mahone (born 1996), American pop singer and songwriter
Ernest Mahone (born 1961), American pediatric neuropsychologist and director
Gildo Mahones (born 1929), American jazz pianist
Michele Mahone (born 1971), American television entertainment reporter and standup comedian
Otelia Butler Mahone (1835–1911), American nurse during the American Civil War  and the wife of Confederate Major General William Mahone
Robert B. Mahone (1858–1914), Consul of the United States at Nuevo Laredo, Mexico
William Mahone (1826–1895), American civil engineer, railroad executive, soldier and politician
William T. Mahone Jr. also known as Master Willie Mahone, (1856–1927), American businessman and government official

Music
The Family Mahone, a folk rock band from Manchester, England

Others
Pogue Mahone, a Gaelic term meaning "kiss my ass" and the name of the seventh album by The Pogues
Alexander Mahone, a fictional character from the television show Prison Break.

Mahones

Sports
CF Sporting Mahonés, Spanish football team based in Mahón, Menorca, in the autonomous community of Balearic Islands
Estadi Mahonés, football stadium in Mahón, Menorca, Spain, in the autonomous community of Balearic Islands

Music
Gildo Mahones (born 1929), American jazz pianist
The Mahones, Irish-born Canadian Irish punk band

See also

Mahon (disambiguation)
McMahon
MacMahon

References